The Seven Wonders of Portugal is a list of cultural wonders located in Portugal.  The creation of the list was supported by the Ministry of Culture and organized by the companies Y&R Brands S.A. and Realizar S.A.

Initially 793 national monuments of Portugal were listed by Instituto Português do Património Arquitectónico (IPPAR) as candidates, however in the first round of selections a board of experts reduced the number to 77.  The contenders were further reduced to 21 finalist in four different categories by Conselho de Notáveis at the University of Évora.

The six-month-long public elections started on 7 December 2006 to select the top seven wonders. Votes could be cast via internet, telephone and SMS. Results of the vote were announced on 7 July 2007 at the Estádio da Luz in Lisbon, as were the results of the global New Seven Wonders of the World contest.

Seven Wonders of Portugal

Other finalists

References

Bibliography

External links 

 The New7Wonders of Nature
 moo.pt - Geo-referenced Wonders

2007 in Portugal
P
Tourist attractions in Portugal